Guinardó | Hospital de Sant Pau (until 2009 Guinardó) is a station of the Barcelona Metro, on L4, serving Ronda del Guinardó and Plaça del Guinardó. The station is due to become part of double line L9-L10 in the near future.

Services

See also
List of Barcelona Metro stations

External links

Trenscat.com

Railway stations in Spain opened in 1974
Barcelona Metro line 4 stations
Transport in Horta-Guinardó